Finneidfjord is a small village in the municipality of Hemnes in Nordland county, Norway.  It is located on a small isthmus, about halfway between the villages of Hemnesberget and Bjerka. The European route E6 highway and the Nordland Line pass through the village.  

The  village has a population (2011) of 392.

References

Hemnes
Villages in Nordland
Populated places of Arctic Norway